Rosa Clotilde Chacel Arimón (June 3, 1898 – July 27, 1994) was a famous and sometimes controversial writer from Spain. She was a native of Valladolid.

Early life
Chacel was born in Valladolid, the daughter of a teacher who sent her to live with her grandmother in Madrid. Chacel's move to Madrid occurred in 1908. Because of her weak health, she was home-schooled by her mother.

By 1909, Chacel's mother enlisted her at Madrid's Escuela de artes y oficios to study drawing,  but, soon after, Chacel followed her teacher, Fernanda Francés, to the newly built Escuela del hogar y Profesional de la Mujer, also in Madrid. It was while in the latter school that Chacel began to take some feminist views. In 1915, Chacel, intrigued by the world of sculpture, enrolled at the Escuela Superior de Bellas Artes de San Fernando, but she soon lost interest in the aforementioned topic and abandoned the school by 1918.

Chacel then went on to become a regular at the Cafe Granja del Henar and at the Ateneo de Madrid. These two places were favorite locations for aspiring writers from all over Spain and other European countries. She delivered a controversial speech there, after a conference about women and their possibilities. Like much of the world at that era, machista views predominated in Spain, and Chacel's dialogue on that conference were considered off base or nonsensical by many members of Madrid's society.

Chacel, nevertheless, went on championing feminism as a new way to live for modern women, and, in 1921, she married a famous painter of the time, Timoteo Perez Rubio. In 1922 the couple settled in Rome after Pérez Rubio was granted a scholarship at the Academia de España. That same year, Chacel wrote her first article for the Ultra magazine. In 1927, she and her husband returned to Madrid.

In 1930, Chacel wrote her first novel, "Estacion, Ida y Vuelta". That same year, the Perez Rubio-Chacel couple had a child, Carlos.  For the next three years, Rosa dedicated herself to motherhood and to promoting her novel. In 1933, she lived alone for six months in Berlin, to recover from her mother's death and a creative crisis. Soon after her return to Spain, the Spanish civil war broke out. Pérez Rubio enlisted in the Republican Army and Chacel performed, among other things, as a nurse. During the same period she also contributed literary magazines Hora de España and Revista de Occidente.

This new, political problem, forced Chacel to move multiple times with her son, and she lived in Barcelona, Valencia, Paris. In the meantime, her husband had the responsibility of moving out of the country the treasuries of the Museo del Prado to preserve them from the war devastation. After the end of the war, the family reunited and travelled to Brazil, where they lived for three decades, with short stays in Buenos Aires.

Exile 
The next years Chacel lived in relative obscurity: a well-known writer but one who had made no new projects in years. This changed in 1959, however, when she won a Guggenheim Fellowship, which allowed her to travel to New York City and return to writing. Chacel worked in New York until 1961, when, with her home country living a calmed down social state, she returned to Spain. In May 1963, Chacel returned to Brazil, where she remained until 1970, when she returned to Spain for a short stay. She would live in Brazil for three more years, as, in 1973, she made her second return to her home country.

Return to Spain 

In 1977, her husband of 56 years died, and Chacel, who was a very frequent flyer between Madrid and Rio de Janeiro, decided to stay in Spain for good. She used her newly found status as a widow to try to rescue some of her old works and to write more novels.

Death and legacy
She died peacefully in Madrid on Sunday, August 7, 1994, aged 96.

The Spanish national airline Iberia Airlines - a company which Chacel perhaps saw as it grew - just like in Luisa Carvajal y Mendoza's case, decided to honor Chacel by naming an Airbus A340 jetliner airliner after her. Perhaps ironically, the "Rosa Chacel Airbus A340" flies very frequently between Madrid's Barajas International Airport and Buenos Aires' Ezeiza International Airport or Rio de Janeiro.

Awards and honors
 Guggenheim Fellowship
 Chacel was granted a Doctor Honoris Causa degree by the University of Valladolid (1989). 
 Towards the end of her life, she won various prestigious awards, some of whom were given by King Juan Carlos. 
 In 1987, she received the "National Award of the Letters (writing)", an award reserved for the very best writers of Spain.
 In 1990, she received the "Premio Castilla y Leon de las letras" ("Castilla y Leon award of the letters"), an award whose winners are chosen by the King.

Notes

Books and newspapers 
 .
 .
 .
 .
 .
 .

External links
Escritoras, about Chacel (in Spanish)
Fundacion Jorge Guillen, about Chacel (in Spanish)

1898 births
1994 deaths
People from Valladolid
Spanish women novelists
Writers from Castile and León
20th-century Spanish novelists
20th-century Spanish women writers
20th-century Spanish writers
Spanish people of the Spanish Civil War (Republican faction)
Exiles of the Spanish Civil War in Mexico
Exiles of the Spanish Civil War in Argentina
Exiles of the Spanish Civil War in the United States
Spanish women of the Spanish Civil War (Republican faction)
Women in the Spanish Civil War
Las Sinsombrero members